Holúbek is a Slovak surname. A female form is  Holúbková, or rarely Holúbeková. Holub means pigeon. A similar Czech name is Holoubek.

The surname may refer to 
Jakub Holúbek Slovak football midfielder
Radoslav Holúbek Slovak sprinter

References

Slovak-language surnames